Le Quotidien can refer to

Le Quotidien (Saguenay), Canadian newspaper
Le Quotidien, a daily newspaper of Cartel des Gauches, France, between the World Wars
Le Quotidien de Paris, French newspaper
Le Quotidien (Senegal), Senegalese newspaper
Le Quotidien (Luxembourg), French-language newspaper published in Luxembourg

See also
 Quotidien, French television programme